"Two Shoes" is a song by Australian band The Cat Empire. it was released in 2005 as the third and final single from the band's second studio album, 'Two Shoes''.

Music video
The video was shot in the city of Melbourne over a period of three days. The video clip starts off with Felix Riebl walking down a pathway, followed by snippets of video on other people.

Track listing

Charts

References

2005 singles
The Cat Empire songs
2005 songs
Virgin Records singles